Carolyn Dailey (born September 4, 1959) is a British-American entrepreneur and commentator. Based in London, she was formerly Time Warner's top executive in Europe. In 2016, she launched Creative Entrepreneurs, a membership-based learning and networking platform to help creative people build successful businesses in the creative industries.

Career

Creative Entrepreneurs 
In January 2016, Dailey launched Creative Entrepreneurs, a movement to inspire and resource entrepreneurs in the creative industries, at No.10 Downing Street, with the support of the Prime Minister David Cameron who declared the initiative "the first of its kind" and Minister of State for Culture and the Digital Economy, Ed Vaizey. A learning and networking platform, Creative Entrepreneurs offers events with high-profile creative founders such as Charlotte Tilbury, ustwo Co-Founder Mills Miller, fashion designer Roksanda Ilincic, Founder of AKQA Ajaz Ahmed, Co-Founder of Frieze, Matthew Slotover and Founder of IMDb, Col Needham. It also offers training courses in partnership with London's Design Museum, and has attracted creative heavyweights, Zaha Hadid, Anya Hindmarch, Jamal Edwards and Rohan Silva as ambassadors.

Online, Creative Entrepreneurs offers searchable curated business resources and also produces original content including Masterclasses with leading experts, inspirational interviews with creative entrepreneur role models and advice pieces from industry experts and investors, big picture think pieces from respected journalists and economic experts and coverage of the major news stories impacting creative entrepreneurship.

Time Warner (Now Warner Media) 
Dailey was Time Warner's top executive in Europe when she resigned. She worked with successive chairmen, CEO's and senior management of Time Warner and divisions HBO, CNN, Warner Bros. and Time Inc. to enter new markets, maximise brand value and establish thought leadership with industry, political, media and creative leaders crucial to Time Warner's success. Dailey originally joined Time Warner with CNN in London as a member of founder Ted Turner's small start-up team that launched CNN in Europe.

Early career 
Starting her career as an M&A lawyer for global law firm White & Case in New York and London, Dailey was previously on staff at the US Congress then held a communications post at Estée Lauder Companies in Paris. From 1990 to 1994 she served as a European Counsel for CNN.

During 2011 to 2019, Daily was the principal stakeholder of The Dailey Partnership Ltd. (formerly Dailey Communications Limited), an advertising agency headquartered at Bexhill-on-sea.

Other Activities 
Dailey appears regularly on Sky News as an expert on the creative industries and, in 2018, was named to Creative Reviews annual "Creative Leaders 50" list, as one of the 50 people driving change in the global creative industry.

Dailey is a Life Member of British Academy of Film and Television Arts (BAFTA) and a Founding Member of Annie Lennox's global women's empowerment charity The Circle. She has been named by Wired UK, in 2010, as one of the UK's "Top 10 Women Digital Powerbrokers" and by the London Evening Standard as one of the 1000 most influential Londoners, each year from 2013 through 2016.

Education
Dailey has a JD magna cum laude from Boston College Law School, a BA with Honours in Art History from UCLA and obtained the Advanced Programme in French Language and Civilisation at the Sorbonne.

References

External links
 Creative Entrepreneurs

1959 births
People from San Francisco
University of California, Los Angeles alumni
Living people
CNN people
Turner Broadcasting System people
Warner Bros. Discovery people
20th-century American businesswomen
20th-century American businesspeople
21st-century American businesswomen
21st-century American businesspeople
20th-century American lawyers
Boston College Law School alumni
The CW executives
Women television executives